Flat Island may refer to:

 Flat Island (Hong Kong)
 Flat Island (Spratly) in the South China Sea
 Flat Island (Falkland Islands) in the south Atlantic Ocean
 Flat Island Wildlife Sanctuary, in the Andaman Islands
 Flat Island, a former separate island now merged by recent volcanic activity with McDonald Island, in the southern Indian Ocean
 Flat Island, one of the Engineer Islands in southeast Papua New Guinea
 Île Plate, also known as Flat Island, a small island off the north coast of Mauritius
 Sandy Point, Newfoundland and Labrador

See also
 Flat Islands (disambiguation)
 Flat Isles
 Flat Islet, Queensland